Al Riffa station is the western terminus of the Doha Metro's Green Line and serves the municipality of Al Rayyan. It is located on Dukhan Highway, opposite of the Mall of Qatar, in the newly developed Rawdat Al Jahhaniya district.

The station currently has no metrolinks. Facilities on the premises include restrooms and a prayer room.

History
The station was opened to the public on 10 December, 2019 along with the other Green Line stations.

Connections
It is served by bus routes 104, 104A and 104B.

References

Doha Metro stations
2019 establishments in Qatar
Railway stations opened in 2019
Rawdat Al Jahhaniya